Passive drinking, like passive smoking, refers to the damage done to others as a result of drinking alcoholic beverages. These include the unborn fetus and children of parents who drink excessively, drunk drivers, accidents, domestic violence and alcohol-related sexual assaults

On 2 February 2010 Eurocare, the European Alcohol Policy Alliance, organised a seminar on “The Social Cost of Alcohol : Passive drinking”. On 21 May 2010 the World Health Organization reached a consensus at the World Health Assembly on a resolution to confront the harmful use of alcohol.

See also
Alcoholism
Binge drinking

References

Alcohol and health
Drinking culture